The Standing Committee on Business and Industry is a standing committee of the Parliament of Norway. It is responsible for policies relating to business, industry, trade, shipping, state ownership policy, competition and price policy, agriculture, food policy, fisheries, whaling and aquaculture. It corresponds to the Ministry of Trade and Industry, the Ministry of Agriculture and Food and the Ministry of Fisheries and Coastal Affairs. The committee has 14 members and is chaired by Marit Arnstad of the Centre Party.

Members 2013–17

References

Standing committees of the Storting